The 1924 Thuringia state election was held on 10 February 1924 to elect the 72 members of the Landtag of Thuringia.

Results

References 

Thuringia
Elections in Thuringia
February 1924 events